Pestilence  may refer to:

Infectious disease
Pestilence, one of the Four Horsemen of the Apocalypse
Pestilence (band), a Dutch death metal group
Pestilence (comics), a Marvel Comics supervillain, based on the biblical horseman
"Pestilence" (Medici: Masters of Florence), a television episode
"The Pestilence", a song by Kreator from Pleasure to Kill
"The Pestilence" is another name for the Black Death.

See also 
Pestilence wort, a perennial plant native to Europe and northern Asia
:Category:Plague gods
Pest (disambiguation)